The Oklahoma Collegiate Conference (OCC), also known as the Oklahoma Collegiate Athletic Conference (OCAC), was an intercollegiate athletic conference that existed from 1929 to 1974. The conference's members were located in the state of Oklahoma.  The league's predecessor was the first iteration of the Oklahoma Intercollegiate Conference, and its successor was the OIC's second iteration.

Football champions

1929 – Central State
1930 – East Central State
1931 – Central State
1932 – Central State and Southwestern State
1933 – Southwestern State
1934 – Central State
1935 – Central State and East Central State
1936 – Central State
1937 – Central State
1938 – Central State
1939 – Central State
1940 – Oklahoma Baptist
1941 – Central State
1942 – Central State
1943 – No champion

1944 – No champion
1945 – No champion
1946 – Southeastern State
1947 – Southeastern State
1948 – Central State and Southeastern State
1949 – Central State
1950 – Central State and Southwestern State
1951 – Northeastern State
1952 – Northeastern State
1953 – Northeastern State
1954 – Central State and Southwestern State
1955 – Central State, Northeastern State, and Southwestern State
1956 – Central State and Northeastern State
1957 – Southwestern State
1958 – Northeastern State

1959 – 
1960 – Langston
1961 –  and 

1962 – Central State (OK)
1963 – Northeastern State
1964 – East Central State
1965 – East Central State
1966 – East Central State
1967 – East Central State and Southeastern State
1968 – Southeastern State
1969 – Northeastern State and Southeastern State
1970 – Southwestern State
1971 – Southwestern State
1972 – Central State
1973 –

See also
 List of defunct college football conferences
 Great American Conference – the NCAA Division II conference home to many of the OCAC's former members
 Sooner Athletic Conference – the present-day NAIA conference with teams in Oklahoma

References